Fjørt (stylised as FJØRT) are a German post-hardcore band from Aachen, formed in February 2012. They have released four studio albums and one EP, and are currently signed to the record label Grand Hotel van Cleef.

History
On 23 November 2012, the band released their first EP, Demontage, on Truelove Entertainment. Although it only consisted of six tracks, two music videos – for Glasgesicht and the title track Demontage – had also been released. During the time leading up to the release of the band's debut full-length album, Fjørt had played around 150 shows. Then, on 21 March 2014, D'accord was released on This Charming Man Records.

2015 saw the band take a step towards signing to a larger label, Grand Hotel van Cleef, through which they released their second album Kontakt on 22 January 2016. In the subsequent months the band embarked upon their first headline tour of Germany, Austria and Switzerland alongside We Never Learned to Live.

Band members

Discography
Studio albums
 D'accord (2014)
 Kontakt (2016)
 Couleur (2017)
 Nichts (2022)

EPs
 Demontage (2012)

References

German musical groups
Musical groups established in 2012
Post-hardcore groups
2012 establishments in Germany
Grand Hotel van Cleef Records artists